Edmund Bernard Dimbulane was a Ceylonese politician.

In March 1955 the sitting member for Alutnuwara, J. A. Rambukpota, died whilst still in office. At the subsequent by-election, held on 28 May 1955, Dimbulane ran as the United National Party candidate. He polled 5,921 votes (58% of the total vote) and 3,114 votes clear of his nearest rival from the Lanka Sama Samaja Party.

He contested the 3rd parliamentary election, held between 5 April 1956 and 10 April 1956, but was unable to retain his seat, losing to the Sri Lanka Freedom Party candidate, K. D. Goonaratne, by 2,448 votes.

References

Date of birth missing
Date of death missing
Members of the 2nd Parliament of Ceylon
Sinhalese politicians
United National Party politicians